The 1989–90 Boston University Terriers men's basketball team represented Boston University during the 1989–90 NCAA Division I men's basketball season. The Terriers, led by fifth year head coach Mike Jarvis, played their home games at Case Gym and were members of the North Atlantic Conference. They finished the season 18–12, 9–3 in NAC play to finish in a tie for the regular season conference title. The Terriers won the NAC tournament to receive an automatic bid to the NCAA tournament as No. 16 seed in the East region. Boston University was defeated by top seed Connecticut in the opening round, 76–52.

Roster

Schedule and results

|-
!colspan=9| Regular season

|-
!colspan=9| NAC tournament

|-
!colspan=9| NCAA tournament

References

Boston University Terriers men's basketball seasons
Boston University
Boston University
Boston University Terriers men's basketball team
Boston University Terriers men's basketball team